Lalrinliana Sailo is a Mizo National Front politician from Mizoram. He has been elected in Mizoram Legislative Assembly election in 2018 from Chalfilh as candidate of Mizo National Front. He is current speaker of Mizoram Legislative Assembly.

References 

1959 births
Living people
Mizo National Front politicians
Indian National Congress politicians from Mizoram
Mizoram MLAs 2018–2023
People from Aizawl
Speakers of the Mizoram Legislative Assembly